Hole in the Moon (Hor B'Levana) is a 1964 Israeli avant-garde-satiric movie directed by Uri Zohar.

The film was heavily influenced by the French New Wave, particularly the films of Jean-Luc Godard. It was a response to the Zionist dramas of the 1950s, and satirizes the form by showing the production of one of these films. Hole in the Moon is an avant-garde film, incorporating elements of metacinema and direct commentary on narrative cinema itself.

Cast
Arik Lavie
Shaike Ophir 
Avraham Heffner
Christiane Dancourt
Uri Zohar
Dahn Ben Amotz

Shmulik Kraus

References

External links

1964 films
Israeli satirical films
1960s Hebrew-language films
Films directed by Uri Zohar